Baetis is a genus of mayflies of the family Baetidae, known as the blue-winged olive to anglers.  There are at least 150 described species in Baetis. They are distributed worldwide, with the most variety in North America and northern Europe.

See also
 List of Baetis species

References

Further reading

External links

 

Mayfly genera